The African Volleyball Clubs Champions Championship is the most important men's competition for volleyball clubs in Africa organised by the African Volleyball Confederation.

Results

By club

Rq:
GS Pétroliers VB (ex. MC Alger VB)

By country

See also
 African Volleyball Cup Winners' Cup

External links
 Men’s African Club Championship - fivb.org

 
International volleyball competitions
African international sports competitions
Multi-national professional sports leagues